Alimentos La Giralda is a Venezuelan trading company that imports, produces and distributes foodstuffs such as capers, pickles, olives, canned fruits and canned vegetables.  It is located in Caracas.  The brand "La Giralda" was registered in 1944 by Francisco Gomez Lopez using what it used to be the emblem of the Spanish association of olive exporters.

In 1979, after buying the brand from Francisco Lopez Gomez, Enrique Moreno de la Cova and the Barceló family founded Alimentos La Giralda and Enrique became president of the company until 1983.

In 1982 it was purchased by the Fierro Group, a very important economic group based in Spain with businesses all over Latin America. It is one of the leaders in the Venezuelan market.

Food and drink companies of Venezuela
Companies established in 1944
1944 establishments in Venezuela
Venezuelan brands
Companies based in Caracas